Kristin Størmer Steira (born 30 April 1981) is a retired Norwegian cross-country skier. She competed from 2002 to 2015, and won six individual World Cup victories and five individual medals at the FIS Nordic World Ski Championships and Winter Olympic Games. She also won four gold medals with the Norway relay team. In Norwegian media, Steira was dubbed "the eternal fourth" due to her many finishes in fourth place.

Career 
At the FIS Nordic World Ski Championships, she has seven medals with two gold (4 × 5 km relay: 2005, 2011), two silvers (7.5 km + 7.5 km double pursuit: 2009, 30 km: 2007), and three bronzes (7.5 km + 7,5 km double pursuit: 2005, 2007; 4 × 5 km relay: 2007).

Steira finished fourth in three individual events (10 km, 7.5 km + 7.5 km double pursuit, 30 km) at the 2006 Winter Olympics in Turin. She has four individual career victories at various levels from 2002 to 2006. In 2009 Steira extended her interests to track athletics and announced her ambition to compete in the 5000 metres at the 2010 European Athletics Championships after achieving a time of 16.02 in Norway. She never did.

In the 2010 Winter Olympics in Vancouver, she came eighth in the 10 km pursuit. More agonisingly, she achieved her fourth fourth-place Olympic finish in the 15 km pursuit, losing out on a medal by 0.1 seconds in a photo finish with Justyna Kowalczyk. This, along with her many fourth places previously, led to Norwegian media jokingly labelling her as "the eternal fourth". On 25 February 2010 Steira became an Olympic champion in the 4 × 5 km relay, racing in the third leg after Vibeke Skofterud and Therese Johaug and before Marit Bjørgen.

She qualified for the 2014 Winter Olympics in Sochi, where she became 23rd in 15 kilometre skiathlon. In the last event, 30 km mass start freestyle, she finally won the bronze, her only individual medal of the Winter Olympics.

On 20 April 2015, Steira announced her retirement from professional skiing.

Cross-country skiing results
All results are sourced from the International Ski Federation (FIS).

Olympic Games
 2 medals – (1 gold, 1 bronze)

World Championships
 8 medals – (3 gold, 2 silver, 3 bronze)

World Cup

Season standings

Individual podiums
 6 victories – (3 , 3 ) 
 22 podiums – (10 , 12 )

Team podiums
 13 victories – (13 ) 
 18 podiums – (18 )

Personal life 
Steira lives in Drøbak, near Oslo, in Norway. She married Canadian skier Devon Kershaw, her boyfriend since December 2012, on 25 July 2015.

References

External links

 
Unofficial Kristin Steira pages (in English)

1981 births
People from Rana, Norway
Cross-country skiers at the 2006 Winter Olympics
Cross-country skiers at the 2010 Winter Olympics
Cross-country skiers at the 2014 Winter Olympics
Living people
Norwegian female cross-country skiers
Olympic cross-country skiers of Norway
Olympic gold medalists for Norway
Olympic bronze medalists for Norway
Olympic medalists in cross-country skiing
FIS Nordic World Ski Championships medalists in cross-country skiing
Tour de Ski skiers
Medalists at the 2010 Winter Olympics
Medalists at the 2014 Winter Olympics
People from Frogn
Sportspeople from Nordland